Federal Highway 8 (Fed. 8) is a free part of the federal highways corridors in Sonora. It is connected to the roadway that transitions from the border post at Lukeville, Arizona where it connects with Arizona State Route 85, proceeds south through Puerto Peñasco with Sonoyta, Sonora, and intersects with Fed. 2.

Major intersections
{| class=wikitable
!Municipality
!Location
!km
!mi
!Roads intersected
!Notes
|-
|rowspan=2|Puerto Peñasco
|Puerto Peñasco
|
|1 de Junio
|Western terminus
|-
|
|
|
|
|-
|rowspan=3|Plutarco Elías Calles
|rowspan=3|Sonoyta
|
|
|Begin overlay of Fed. 2
|-
|
|
|End overlay of Fed. 2
|-
|
|
|Eastern terminus at Mexico-U.S. border proceeding into Pima County, AZ

References

Gran Desierto de Altar
008